1984 Emperor's Cup Final was the 64th final of the Emperor's Cup competition. The final was played at National Stadium in Tokyo on January 1, 1985. Yomiuri won the championship.

Overview
Yomiuri won their 1st title, by defeating Furukawa Electric 2–0. Yomiuri was featured a squad consisting of Yasutaro Matsuki, Hisashi Kato, Satoshi Tsunami, Yukitaka Omi, Ryoichi Kawakatsu, George Yonashiro and Tetsuya Totsuka.

Match details

See also
1984 Emperor's Cup

References

Emperor's Cup
1984 in Japanese football
Tokyo Verdy matches
JEF United Chiba matches